Keith Harris Glauber (born January 18, 1972) is a former Major League Baseball pitcher who played for the Cincinnati Reds in  and .  He was selected in the 42nd round in 1994 as the 1169th player by the St. Louis Cardinals.

He was born in Brooklyn, New York, and is Jewish. He attended Marlboro High School in Marlboro, New Jersey, Coastal Carolina University in Conway, South Carolina, and Montclair State University in Montclair, New Jersey.

References

External links

1972 births
Living people
Cincinnati Reds players
Major League Baseball pitchers
Baseball players from New Jersey
Montclair State Red Hawks baseball players
Coastal Carolina Chanticleers baseball players
Jewish American baseball players
Jewish Major League Baseball players
Sportspeople from Brooklyn
Baseball players from New York City
Marlboro High School alumni
Sportspeople from Monmouth County, New Jersey
Coastal Carolina University alumni
Montclair State University alumni
Arkansas Travelers players
Burlington Bees players
Chattanooga Lookouts players
Indianapolis Indians players
Louisville Redbirds players
Louisville RiverBats players
New Jersey Cardinals players
Peoria Chiefs players
Savannah Cardinals players
21st-century American Jews